Arunamalaia is a genus of moths of the family Crambidae. It contains only one species, Arunamalaia banderdewaensis, which is found in India (Arunachal Pradesh).

References

Pyraustinae
Monotypic moth genera
Moths of Asia
Crambidae genera